African currency was originally formed from basic items, materials, animals and even people available in the locality to create a medium of exchange. This started to change from the 17th century onwards, as European colonial powers introduced their own monetary system into the countries they invaded.

As African countries achieved independence during the 20th century, some retained the new denominations that had been introduced, though others renamed their currencies for various reasons. Today, inflation often creates a demand for more stable (but forbidden) foreign currency, while in rural areas the original bartering system is still in widespread usage. As of 1 March 2019, the Libyan dinar (LYD) has the strongest currency in Africa.

History

Pre-colonial era 
In pre-colonial times, many objects were sometimes used as currency in Africa. These included shells, ingots, gold (gold dust and gold coins (the Asante)), arrowheads, iron, salt, cattle, goats, blankets, axes, beads, and many others. In the early 19th century a slave could be bought in West Africa with manilla currency; multiples of X-shaped rings of bronze or other metal that could be strung on a staff.

Colonial era 
During colonial times (roughly from 1680 to 1990) the respective colonial powers introduced their own currencies to their colonies or produced local versions of their currencies. These included the Somali shilling; the Italian East African lira; and the African franc (in Francophone countries). Many post-colonial governments have retained the name and notional value unit system of their prior colonial era currency. For example, the British West African pound was replaced by the Nigerian pound, which was divided into shillings, before being replaced by the naira.

Modern day 
A different trend was seen when the predominant foreign power relationship changed, causing a change in the currency: the East African rupee (from long-term trade with Arabia and India) was replaced by the East African shilling after the British became the predominant power in the region. Other countries threw off the dominant currency of a neighbour: the Botswana pula replaced the South African rand in Botswana in 1976. Some countries have not changed their currency despite being post-colonial, for example Uganda retains the Ugandan shilling.

Many African countries change their currency's appearance when a new government takes power (often the new head of state will appear on bank notes), though the notional value remains the same. Also, in many African currencies there have been episodes of rampant inflation, resulting in the need for currency revaluation (e.g. the Zimbabwe dollar). In some places there is a thriving street trade by unlicensed street traders in US dollars or other stable currencies, which are seen as a hedge against local inflation. The exchange rate is grossly more favourable to the seller of the foreign currency than is the official bank rate, but such trading is usually illegal.

In many rural areas there is still a strong bartering culture, the exchanged items being of more immediate value than official currency (following the principle that one can eat a chicken, but not a coin). Even where currency is used, haggling over prices is very common. This is in contrast with the pre-independence Rhodesian dollar which was always a strong currency linked to the British pound.

Regional currencies

Continent 

There is a proposal for a monetary union of the entire African continent, which would call for the creation of a new unified currency, similar to the euro. The hypothetical currency is sometimes referred to as the afro or afriq. In April 2021, Wamkele Mene, Secretary General of the AfCFTA said: "I don't know how long it will take for Africa to have a common currency. It may not happen in our lifetime, but we have got to start somewhere to address the multiplicity of currencies as a constraint for intra-Africa trade".

West Africa 

The West African Monetary Zone (WAMZ) has proposed to create a common currency for all West Africa states, the Eco. In May 2020, an agreement between the French government and 8 West African countries was reached, meaning to change the CFA franc to the Eco; though no plan has been established as of January 2021. However, due to the impacts of the COVID-19 pandemic, Côte d'Ivoire president Alassane Ouattara reportedly said in September 2020 he does not expect the eco to be implemented for another 3 to 5 years.

East Africa 

Similarly, in East Africa, the member countries of the East African Community planned to introduce a single currency, the East African shilling until 2012. Following delays, this was later postponed to 2024.

Present currencies

See also
 List of central banks of Africa

Notes

References

External links
Profile of the African Union
List of All Currencies Country Wise

de:Wirtschaft Afrikas#Afrikanische Währungen